Nights Out is the second studio album by English electronic music band Metronomy, released on 8 September 2008 by Because Music.

Background
The starting point for the album was, according to lead singer Joseph Mount, "a half-arsed concept album about going out and having a crap time."

Mount wrote and recorded most of the album by himself, but instrumentalists Gabriel Stebbing and Oscar Cash "play bits on a couple of tracks on the album and it's kind of become... Metronomy used to be a him and now it's definitely a they – which takes the heat off me a bit as well".

Artwork
The artwork for the album was created by airbrush artist Philip Castle.

Release
The commercial pressing of the album has a printing error on the cover; instead of reading Nights Out, it merely says Nights. The promotional version is unaffected. It is unknown whether this will be rectified in the next pressing of the album.

In 2012, the album was awarded a double silver certification from the Independent Music Companies Association (IMPALA), denoting sales in excess of 40,000 copies across Europe.

Singles and EPs
Four singles/EPs were released from Nights Out: Radio Ladio – EP, My Heart Rate Rapid – EP, Holiday – Single and Heartbreaker.

"Radio Ladio", released on 12 November 2007, the accompanying video by Daniel Brereton features Joseph, Oscar and Gabriel with their skin painted blues and greens, playing kiddie-like pianos that have incorrect keys while they lust after an unobtainable woman, who at the end is revealed to be a cardboard cut-out.

"My Heart Rate Rapid", released on 7 April 2008, featured remixes from Primary 1 and Maton while the video directed by Dandi Wind featured zentai-suited women dancing in front of a backdrop of lava flows, eruptions fire, toy trains and psychedelic animations.

"Holiday" was first released as a single on 7 July 2008, along with a video by Daniel Brereton. It features the band playing in a studio with weird objects such as a warped mirror, a coloured lilo and many men walking through, holding such objects entering and leaving the shot. Most notably the band all wear sunglasses with the word Holiday written on the lens.

"Holiday" was jointly released in France with Heartbreaker on 1 August 2008 with remixes by other artists.

"Heartbreaker" is the fourth song, released on 1 September 2008 and features the Heartbreaker – EP and Heartbreaker (Dark Disco Remixes) – EP. The video was released on an enhanced version of Nights Out and shows Oscar Cash (apparently having been dumped by a girl) with his friends in their car going to an arcade, a fair and the beach, among others.

"A Thing for Me" is the fifth single and the first released subsequent to the release of Nights Out. The video features the band and several girls and karaoke words on them with the rolling ball hitting them on the head as it is sung along. It also features cutaways to a projector slideshow with speech bubbles featuring the lyrics (even though some are just words that sound alike).
The song recently remixed by French artist Breakbot (on Ed Banger Records).

Critical reception

The album was placed at number five on NMEs "Top 50 Albums of 2008" list.

Track listing

Nights In
A six-track bonus CD was released alongside the album and was available if the album was purchased in Rough Trade stores or in the Rough Trade Album Club. The CD contains:

Personnel
Credits adapted from the liner notes of Nights Out.

 Metronomy – recording, production, mixing
 Nilesh Patel – mastering
 Philip Castle – original artwork
  – design

Charts

References 

2008 albums
Metronomy albums
Because Music albums